Felipe Aliste Lopes (born 7 August 1987) is a Brazilian professional footballer who plays as a centre-back.

He also possessed Portuguese nationality due to the many years spent in the country with Nacional, with which he appeared in 181 official matches and scored nine goals.

Club career
Born in Osasco, São Paulo, Lopes started playing professionally with Guarani Futebol Clube, competing with the club in the second division. In 2006, aged only 19, he moved abroad and joined R.S.C. Anderlecht, being part of the squad that won the national championship but failing to appear in the league.

In the summer of 2007, Lopes signed for C.D. Nacional in Portugal, making his Primeira Liga debut on 21 December of that year, starting in a 1–0 home win against FC Porto and being sent off in the 87th minute. He finished his first season, however, with only seven league games played (eight official).

Subsequently, Lopes became first-choice for the Madeirans – in a roster filled with compatriots – appearing in 25 matches in the 2008–09 campaign as the team finished in a best-ever fourth position with the subsequent qualification to the UEFA Europa League, and bettering those totals in the following years.

On 5 January 2012, Lopes signed for VfL Wolfsburg for an undisclosed fee, penning a three-and-a-half-year contract. He made his Bundesliga debut on 21 January in a 1–0 home win against 1. FC Köln, playing the full 90 minutes.

On 22 January 2013, Lopes was loaned out to fellow league side VfB Stuttgart until the end of the season, with the club securing an option to sign him permanently in June, but finally not activating the clause. Returned to the Volkswagen Arena, he did not make a single competitive appearance in two years after suffering a stroke while he watched the third-place play-off of the 2014 FIFA World Cup (he also did not collect one single minute the previous campaign).

Lopes returned to Portugal and its top division in summer 2016, agreeing to a one-year deal with newly promoted G.D. Chaves.

References

External links

1987 births
Living people
People from Osasco
Footballers from São Paulo (state)
Brazilian emigrants to Portugal
Naturalised citizens of Portugal
Brazilian footballers
Association football defenders
Campeonato Brasileiro Série B players
Guarani FC players
R.S.C. Anderlecht players
Primeira Liga players
Liga Portugal 2 players
C.D. Nacional players
G.D. Chaves players
Bundesliga players
VfL Wolfsburg players
VfB Stuttgart players
Brazilian expatriate footballers
Expatriate footballers in Belgium
Expatriate footballers in Portugal
Expatriate footballers in Germany
Brazilian expatriate sportspeople in Belgium
Brazilian expatriate sportspeople in Portugal
Brazilian expatriate sportspeople in Germany